Hodoyoshi 1 is a Japanese 60 kg-class microsatellite.  It was launched on 6 November 2014 by a Dnepr rocket into the 500 km sun-synchronous orbit along with Asnaro-1 and other microsatellites.

See also

 Hodoyoshi 3
 Hodoyoshi 4

Notes

External links

 Hodoyoshi-1 at 
 Hodoyoshi-1 at eoPortal Directory

Earth observation satellites of Japan
University of Tokyo
Spacecraft launched in 2014
Spacecraft launched by Dnepr rockets